Paul Atherstone Grabowsky  (born 27 September 1958) is an Australian pianist and composer.

Biography
Born in Lae, Papua New Guinea, Grabowsky is a pianist and composer of music for film, theatre and opera. His father Alistair had lived in Papua New Guinea with his wife Charlotte since the 1930s working on oil rigs, building roads, flying planes. Grabowsky described his ancestry as "failed Polish aristocracy". His grandfather was a legitimate Polish Count of the Grabowksi noble family, a descendant of Jan Jerzy Grabowski from where he gets his title; his grandfather was exiled from Poland and lived in Scotland.  His older brother Michael took great interest in the young composer and later worked with Paul co-ordinating and producing many of his television and film scores in the 1990s.

Grabowsky grew up in Glen Waverley, Melbourne, Australia, and began piano lessons when he was five years old. He studied the classical repertoire with Mack Jost, senior lecturer in piano at the Conservatorium of Music at the University of Melbourne from the age of seven until his university years. He attended Wesley College and it was that school's jazz band which introduced him to the genre.

1980s

Immersing himself in jazz, Grabowsky left the conservatorium in 1978 to pursue musical studies at the Juilliard School in New York and then embarked on extensive travel in Europe. 1980 he worked in the Melbourne cabaret/comedy scene where he began his relationship with Steve Vizard and Robyn Archer. He flew in 1980 to London where he travelled via Spain to Germany; he lived there in Munich until 1985. He had been back in Australia for Christmas 1982 when, on the invitation of Red Symons, he co-composed his first film score, the first of many. In Europe he played with many musicians including Chet Baker, Art Farmer and Johnny Griffin as well as influential European artists. In 1983, Grabowsky formed the Paul Grabowsky Trio with Allan Browne and Gary Costello. The duo recorded the album Six by Three, which was released in 1989 and won the trio an ARIA Music Award at the ARIA Music Awards of 1990.

After his return to Australia in 1986, he played in various jazz ensembles. Grabowsky produced Vince Jones' ARIA Award-winning album It All Ends Up In Tears. In 1987, Grabowsky formed the Wizards of Oz with Saxophonist Dale Barlow, bassist Lloyd Swanton and drummer Tony Buck. Wizards of Oz recorded Soundtrack and won the ARIA Award for Best Jazz Album at the ARIA Music Awards of 1989. During this time, he also wrote the score to the film The Last Days of Chez Nous and for television shows Phoenix, Janus and Fast Forward.

1990s
Grabowsky and the Groovematics were the innovative house band on the Seven Network TV show Tonight Live with Steve Vizard from February 1990 to November 1993. This show was live five nights a week. Grabowsky also continued to compose scores for feature films many of which won awards.

In 1990 he was commissioned to write several pieces for the Munich-based jazz/contemporary-music group Die Konferenz. One group of these was based on songs of Édith Piaf ("Et les Affaires Piaf"), while a second group was based on songs from German UFA films from the 1920s to 1940s ("Es wird einmal ein Wunder"). With the support from its artistic director Richard Wherrett, this led to the formation of the project Ringing the Bell Backwards at the Melbourne International Arts Festival and eventually to the Australian Art Orchestra in 1994. That year, Grabowsky wrote a piano concerto for Michael Kieran Harvey.

He is married to Margot Salomon and in 1991 their first child was born; Isabella Grabowsky. Their son Guy Grabowsky was born in 1995..

In 1995, the Australian Art Orchestra toured Europe, and later India in 1996. Grabowsky directed the Victorian Arts Centre's Summer Music programme. Late that year he was commissioned to front the 14-part ABC TV series Access All Areas. As Commissioning Editor for ABC Television Arts and Entertainment (1996–1998), he commissioned the documentary series Long Way to the Top. During the late 1990s, Grabowsky concentrated on writing music for film and television: Molokai: The Story of Father Damien (1999) and Innocence (2000) by Paul Cox, Siam Sunset by John Polson, the NBC mini-series Noah's Ark, the UK production Shiner. Northern Rivers Performing Arts (NORPA) commissioned his first opera, The Mercenary with a (libretto by Janis Balodis).

2000s
In 2000, the project The Theft of Sita (a collaboration with Wayan Yudane) came to fruition; it combined jazz elements, Balinese gamelan music and puppetry. The piece premiered in Adelaide, and has since toured worldwide. In that year, Grabowsky was also involved in the writing music for the opening ceremonies of the Sydney Olympics and the Paralympics. Since then, he has written the opera Love in the Age of Therapy (libretto by Joanna Murray-Smith) commissioned by Melbourne Festival and Sydney Festival, and the symphony Streets of Hurqalya (26 June 2002), commissioned by the Melbourne Symphony Orchestra. Among his recent film scores are Fred Schepisi's Last Orders and It Runs in the Family, The Eye Of The Storm, Empire Falls (HBO) Paul Cox's The Diaries of Vaslav Nijinsky, and Disney's The Jungle Book 2. From 2003 to 2007, Grabowsky was commissioner at the Australian Film Commission. In 2004 he became involved in Charles Darwin University's Remote Indigenous Music Program.

In 2004, Grabowsky visited the remote community in the Northern Territory called Ngukurr, in order to meet the traditional songmen. He met with the local elders and, after hearing two Wagilak songmen sing, asked permission to bring his orchestra on a return visit. When he returned in 2005, he brought singer-songwriters Archie Roach and his wife Ruby Hunter, along with 10 members of his Australian Art Orchestra. After working together for five days, the musicians staged a concert in the town. The European musicians learnt about the manikay (song cycles) and were led to experiment with whole new ways of exploring sound.

The resulting project, called Crossing Roper Bar, toured the Northern Territory, played at the Birrarung Marr park in Melbourne, the National Gallery of Victoria, Apollo Bay Music Festival and the Sydney Opera House. When the group travelled to Gulkula to play at the 2006 Garma Festival, the Yolngu songmen from nearby regions were amazed, thinking that those songs had been lost long ago. In 2010 a Crossing Roper Bar album was released.

In 2005, Grabowsky was appointed Artistic Director for the Queensland Music Festival 2007. His song cycle Before Time Could Change Us, lyrics by Dorothy Porter and featuring Katie Noonan, was commissioned by the Queensland Music Festival and released in 2005 by the Warner Music Group. The album peaked at number 65 on the ARIA Charts and number 3 on the ARIA Jazz chart. He recorded an album of original jazz compositions, Tales of Time and Space, with Branford Marsalis (soprano sax), Joe Lovano (tenor sax), Scott Tinkler (trumpet), Ed Schuller (bass) and Jeff "Tain" Watts (drums). In 2007 he was appointed inaugural patron of the National Film and Sound Archive's project Sounds of Australia.

On 4 January 2008, the prestigious Adelaide Festival of Arts appointed Grabowsky as its artistic director for the 2010 festival, its 50th anniversary year. He was then asked to stay on and direct the 2012 Adelaide Festival.

2010s
In June 2012, Grabowsky was appointed Vice-Chancellor's Professorial Fellow in the School of Music at Monash University and in July 2012, he was appointed Executive Director, Performing Arts, Academy of Performing Arts, Monash University.

In 2014 Grabowsky was awarded the Order of Australia (AO) for services to music as an educator, a mentor composer and pianist. He won his 5th Aria Award in 2014 for his sextet recording of original compositions The Bitter Suite.

In 2015/2016 he wrote the music and songs for theatre work Last Man Standing performed by the Melbourne Theatre Company, words and play by Steve Vizard; the two teamed again to write another new music theatre work, Banquet of Secrets, performed by the Victorian Opera company.

Awards and nominations

AIR Awards
The Australian Independent Record Awards (commonly known informally as AIR Awards) is an annual awards night to recognise, promote and celebrate the success of Australia's Independent Music sector.

|-
| AIR Awards of 2008
|Lost and Found 
| Best Independent Jazz Album
| 
|-
| AIR Awards of 2010
|On a Clear Day 
| Best Independent Jazz Album
| 
|-
| AIR Awards of 2014
|The Bitter Suite 
| Best Independent Jazz Album
| 
|-
| AIR Awards of 2017
| Provanance (with Vince Jones)
| Best Independent Jazz Album
| 
|-
| AIR Awards of 2020
| Tryst
| Best Independent Jazz Album or EP
| 
|-

APRA Awards
The APRA Awards (Australia) are annual awards to celebrate excellence in contemporary music, which honour the skills of member composers, songwriters and publishers who have achieved outstanding success in sales and airplay performance. They commenced in 1982. Paul Grabowsky has won seven awards from twenty nominations.

|-
| 1989 || "Disappearing Shoreline" || Most Performed Australasian Jazz Work|| 
|-
| 1990 || "Tonite I'm Alive with You"  || Most Performed Australasian Jazz Work|| 
|-
|rowspan="2"| 1993 || Phoenix (Series 2) || Television or Film Theme of the Year|| 
|-
| "Welcome to the World of Major Crime" || Jazz Composition of the Year ||
|-
| 1996 || Mushrooms || Best Film Score || 
|-
| 2000 || Siam Sunset || Best Film Score || 
|-
| 2001 || Innocence || Best Film Score || 
|-
| 2004 || "Stars Apart"  || Most Performed Jazz Work of the Year || 
|-
| 2005 || Art of War || Best Music for a Television Series or Serial  || 
|-
|rowspan="2"| 2006 || "Silverland" || Most Performed Jazz Work of the Year || 
|-
| Unfolding Florence: The Many Lives of Florence Broadhurst || Best Music for a Documentary ||
|-
| 2009 || "Raindrop" || Jazz Work of the Year || 
|-
| 2013 || "Falling"  || Instrumental Work of the Year || 
|-
| 2014 || "Tall Tales"  || Jazz Work of the Year || 
|-
|rowspan="2"| 2015 || "Love Like a Curse"  || Jazz Work of the Year || 
|-
| "The Nightingale and the Rose"  || Instrumental Work of the Year ||  
|-
|rowspan="2"| 2016 || "Nyilipidgi"  ||rowspan="2"| Jazz Work of the Year || 
|-
| "Spiel"  || 
|-
| 2017 || "Moons of Jupiter" || Jazz Work of the Year || 
|-
| 2018 || Comeclose and Sleepnow: Six Liverpool Love Songs  || Vocal / Choral Work of the Year || 
|-

ARIA Awards
The ARIA Music Awards are annual awards, which recognises excellence, innovation, and achievement across all genres of Australian music. They commenced in 1987. Paul Grabowsky has won seven awards from seventeen nominations.

! 
|-
| 1990 || Six by Three  ||rowspan="3"| Best Jazz Album ||  || 
|-
| 1991 || The Moon & You||  || 
|-
|rowspan="2"| 1993 || Tee Vee||   || 
|-
| The Last Days of Chez Nous || Best Original Soundtrack/Cast/Show Album||  || 
|-
| 1996 || When Words Fail  ||rowspan="2"| Best Jazz Album ||   || 
|-
| 1998 || Angel ||   || 
|-
| 2000 || Siam Sunset ||Best Original Soundtrack Album||   || 
|-
| 2001 || Three  ||rowspan="7"| Best Jazz Album ||  || 
|-
| 2004 || Tales of Time and Space||  || 
|-
| 2005 || Before Time Could Change Us  ||  ||  
|-
| 2006 || Always  ||  || 
|-
| 2014 || The Bitter Suite ||  || 
|-
| 2015 || Solo ||  || 
|-
|rowspan="2"| 2016 || Provenance  ||  || 
|-
| Nyilipidgi  || Best World Music Album||  
|-
| 2019 || Tryst  ||Best Jazz Album||  || 
|-
| 2020 || Please Leave Your Light On  ||Best Jazz Album||  || 
|-

Australian Jazz Bell Awards
The Australian Jazz Bell Awards, (also known as the Bell Awards or The Bells), are annual music awards for the jazz music genre in Australia. They commenced in 2003.

|-
| 2006 
| Paul Grabowsky 
| Australian Jazz Artist of the Year
| 
|-
| 2007 
| "Five Bells" – Paul Grabowsky
| Australian Jazz Composition of the Year
| 
|-
| 2009
| Lost and Found (as Oehlers, Grabowsky, Beck)
| Best Australian Contemporary Jazz Album
| 
|-

 Note wins only

Helpmann Awards
The Helpmann Awards is an awards show, celebrating live entertainment and performing arts in Australia, presented by industry group Live Performance Australia since 2001. Note: 2020 and 2021 were cancelled due to the COVID-19 pandemic.
 

! 
|-
| 2001
| The Theft of Sita (with I Wayan Gde Yudane)
| Helpmann Award for Best Original Score
| 
|
|-
| 2003
| Love in the Age of Therapy (with Joanna Murray-Smith)
| Best Original Score
| 
|
|-
| 2005
| Tales of Time and Space
| Helpmann Award for Best Performance in an Australian Contemporary Concert
| 
|
|-

Music Victoria Awards
The Music Victoria Awards are an annual awards night celebrating Victorian music. They commenced in 2006.

! 
|-
| Music Victoria Awards of 2017
| Torrio! (With Mirko Guerrini & Niko Schäuble)
| Best Jazz Album
| 
| 
|-

Sidney Myer Performing Arts Awards
The Sidney Myer Performing Arts Awards commenced in 1984 and recognise outstanding achievements in dance, drama, comedy, music, opera, circus and puppetry.

|-
| 2001 || Paul Grabowsky  || Individual Award || 
|-

Other Awards
1988 & 1989 Rolling Stone Magazine (Australia) Jazz Artist of the Year
1989 AFI nomination (Best Original Music Score) for Georgia
1991 AFI nomination (Best Music Score) for A Woman's Tale
1992 AFI nomination (Best Music Score) for The Last Days of Chez Nous
1994 AFI nomination (Best Original Music Score) for Exile
1995 AFI Award (Open Craft Award) for The Good Looker
1999 Australian Guild of Screen Composers nomination for the film Siam Sunset
2000 The Age Award (Best Production) for The Theft of Sita
2003 World Soundtrack Academy nomination for The Jungle Book 2
2004 AFI (Open Craft Award) nomination for Jessica
2006 AFI nomination for Unfolding Florence: The Many Lives of Florence Broadhurst
2007 Melbourne Prize for Music

Discography
{| class="wikitable plainrowheaders" style="text-align:center;"
|+ List of albums, with selected chart positions 
! scope="col" rowspan="2" style="width:14em;"| Title
! scope="col" rowspan="2" style="width:20em;"| Album details
! scope="col" colspan="1"| Peak chart positions
|-
! scope="col" style="width:3em;font-size:90%;"| AUS
|-
! scope="row"| The Moon + You 
|
 Released: 1990
 Label: WEA (171142-1)
 Formats: CD, LP
| –
|-
! scope="row"| The Zurich Sessions (with Sunk Poeschl and Peter Bockius)
|
 Released: 1990
 Label: 
 Formats: 12” Vinyl
| –
|-
! scope="row"| Tee Vee 
|
 Released: 1992
 Label: EastWest (9031755752)
 Formats: CD
| -
|- 
! scope="row"| The Last Days of Chez Nous (soundtrack)
|
 Released: 1992
 Label: 
 Formats: CD, Cassette
| –
|-
! scope="row"| Phoenix (soundtrack)
|
 Released: 1993
 Label: ABC Music, Phonogram (514445–2)
 Formats: CD
| –
|-
! scope="row"| Viva Viva
|
 Released: 1993
 Label: EastWest, Warner Music (4509941672)
 Formats: CD
| –
|- 
! scope="row"|Angel <small> (with Shelley Scown)
|
Released: 1997
Label: ORIGiN (OR 025) 
| –
|-
! scope="row"| Keep Up Your Standards (with Robyn Archer)
|
 Released: 1997
 Label: Larrikin Records (LRF483)
 Formats: CD
| –
|-
! scope="row"| Passion(with Australian Art Orchestra)
|
 Released: 1999
 Label: ABC Classics (465 230-2)
 Formats: CD
| –
|-
! scope="row"| Noah's Ark (soundtrack)
|
 Released: 1999
 Label: Varèse Sarabande (VSD6027)
 Formats: CD
| –
|-
! scope="row"| Siam Sunset  (soundtrack)
|
 Released: 1999
 Label: Mana Music (D32124)
 Formats: CD
| –
|-
! scope="row"| Shiner  (soundtrack)
|
 Released: 2000
 Label: Decca (470183-2)
 Formats: CD
| –
|-
! scope="row"| Last Orders  (soundtrack)
|
 Released: 2002
 Label: Colosseum (CVS 6330.2)
 Formats: CD
| –
|-
! scope="row"| Big Adventure  (with Philip Rex and Niko Schauble)
|
 Released: 2004
 Label: ABC Jazz (476283-5)
 Formats: CD, Digital Download
| –
|-
! scope="row"| Tales Of Time And Space
|
 Released: 2004
 Label: ABC Jazz (476283-5)
 Formats: CD, Digital Download
| –
|-
! scope="row"| Ruby   (with Archie Roach, Ruby Hunter and Australian Art)
|
 Released: 2005
 Label: Australian Art Orchestra
 Formats: CD, Digital Download
| –
|-

! scope="row"| Before Time Could Change Us   (with Katie Noonan)
|
 Released: August 2005
 Label: Australian Art Orchestra
 Formats: CD, Digital Download
| 65
|-
! scope="row"| Hush Collection  (Volume 3: Paul Grabowsky)
|
 Released: 2005
 Label: Hush Music Foundation (HUSH 003)
 Formats: CD
| –
|-
! scope="row"| Always  (with Bernie McGann)
|
 Released: May 2006
 Label: ABC Jazz – (4765272)
 Formats: CD, DD
| –
|-
! scope="row"| Hush Collection  (Volume 7: Ten Healing Songs by Paul Grabowsky)
|
 Released: 2007
 Label: Hush Music Foundation (HUSH 007)
 Formats: CD
| –
|-
! scope="row"| Lost and Found (with Jamie Oehlers and David Beck)
|
 Released: 2007
 Label: Jazzhead
 Formats: CD
| –
|-

! scope="row"| On a Clear Day (with Jamie Oehlers)
|
 Released: July 2010
 Label: Jamie Oehlers , Paul Grabowsky
 Formats: CD, DD
| –
|-

! scope="row"| The Bitter Suite (as Paul Grabowsky Sextet)
|
 Released: May 2014
 Label: ABC Jazz (3771278)
 Formats: CD, DD
| –
|-
! scope="row"| Solo
|
 Released: 31 October 2014
 Label: ABC Jazz (4703342)
 Formats: CD, DD
| –
|-
! scope="row"| Words and Pictures (Soundtrack)
|
 Released: March 2015
 Label: Lakeshore Records
 Formats: CD, DD
| –
|-
! scope="row"| Spiel (with Nikolaus Schäuble)
|
 Released: August 2015
 Label: Paul Grabowsky and Nico Schäuble
 Formats: CD, DD
| –
|-
! scope="row"| Provenance (with Vince Jones)
|
 Released: 16 October 2015
 Label: ABC Jazz (4753486)
 Formats: CD, DD
| –
|-
! scope="row"| Nyilipidgi (with Daniel Ngukurr Boy Wilfred, David Yipininy Wilfred and Monash Art Ensemble)
|
 Released: June 2016
 Label: ABC Jazz (4796386)
 Formats: CD, DD
| –
|-
! scope="row"| Shift (with Rob Burke, George Lewis and Mark Helias)
|
 Released: 7 April 2017
 Label: Future Music Records (FMRCD441-0217)
 Formats: CD, DD
| –
|-
! scope="row"| Torrio!<ref>{{cite web|url=https://itunes.apple.com/au/album/torrio/1308228952|title=Torrio! | work= iTunes Australia |access-date=19 April 2019}}</ref> (with Mirko Guerrini, Niko Schäuble)
|
 Released: November 2017
 Label: Encore Jazz
 Formats: DD
| –
|-
! scope="row"| Moons of Jupiter (featuring Scott Tinkler, Erkki Veltheim and Peter Knight)
|
 Released: 24 April 2018
 Label: Besant Hall Records
 Formats: DD
| –
|-
! scope="row"| Tryst (with Kate Ceberano)
|
 Released: 3 May 2019
 Label: ABC / Universal Music Australia (7762180)
 Formats: CD, DD, Streaming
| –
|-
! scope="row"| Please Leave Your Light On (with Paul Kelly)
|
 Released: 31 July 2020
 Label: EMI Music
 Formats: CD, DD, Streaming, LP
| 3
|-
|}

References

Further reading

M. Wangler: ": Paul Grabowsky", '', xxxiv/7 (1985), 4 
Roger T. Dean: "Grabowsky, Paul", Grove Music Online. ed. L. Macy

External links

The Australian Art Orchestra

Air-Edel Associates
"Introducing... Paul Grabowsky" at the State Library of Queensland

1958 births
21st-century pianists
21st-century Australian male musicians
21st-century Australian musicians
Living people
Juilliard School alumni
APRA Award winners
ARIA Award winners
Australian film score composers
Australian jazz composers
Male jazz composers
Australian jazz pianists
Australian people of Polish descent
Helpmann Award winners
Officers of the Order of Australia
Male film score composers
Academic staff of Monash University
Musicians from Melbourne
People educated at Wesley College (Victoria)
University of Melbourne alumni
Male pianists
Paul Grabowsky Trio members
Wizards of Oz members
People from Glen Waverley, Victoria